The Boeing Vertol XCH-62 (Model 301) was a triple-turbine, heavy-lift helicopter project designed for the United States Army by Boeing Vertol. Approved in 1971, one prototype reached 95% completion before it was canceled in 1975. The prototype was scrapped in 2005.

Development

For a long time Boeing and the US military had an urge to match or top the Mil heavy lifters. In the late 1960s, Boeing came up with designs for machines with broad similarities to the Sea Knight and Chinook, but about twice the size of the Chinook in terms of linear dimensions. Proposed machines included the "Model 227" transport and the "Model 237" flying crane.

The U.S. Department of Defense (DoD) issued a request for proposal (RFP) for a Heavy Lift Helicopter (HLH) in November 1970. On May 7, 1971, the DoD announced the selection of Boeing Vertol to perform the first phase of HLH development. Following award of an Army contract for an HLH prototype in 1973, Boeing did move forward on building an oversized flying crane machine, the "XCH-62". The XCH-62 prototype was in an advanced state of assembly in 1975, being readied for a planned initial flight in 1976. The XT701 engine had passed its 30-hour Prototype Preliminary Flight Rating Test (PPFRT) on March 12, 1975, and then passed a 60-hour Safety Demonstration Test (SDT) on August 4. However, the program was officially canceled on August 1. At the time of cancellation, the prototype was at 95% completion, and it needed about three months of final assembly and checkouts before rollout and installation for pre-flight testing.

Failures in the spiral bevel gearing of the main transmission were experienced in tests because the method of analysis employed had not considered the effect of rim bending. Consequently, new gears with strengthened rims were designed and fabricated. For a more accurate prediction of the load capacity of the gears, an extensive Finite Element Method (FEM) system was developed. The U.S. Army's XCH-62 HLH aft rotor transmission was finally successfully tested at full design torque and speed, but the US Congress cut funding for the program in August 1975. The designers of the Mil Mi-26 avoided similar problems by using a split-torque design in the main rotor transmission.

Subsequent attempts were made to finish the incomplete XCH-62 prototype, which had a serial number of 73-22012. In the mid-1980s, the Army, the US National Aeronautics & Space Administration (NASA), and the Defense Advanced Research Projects Agency (DARPA) collaborated on a scheme to finish the XCH-62 for experimental flights, requesting a combined USD$71 million in funding through fiscal year 1989. However, Congress declined funding, and the craft remained incomplete. The prototype was moved from a warehouse storage site in Philadelphia, Pennsylvania, floated by barge to Panama City, Florida, and then lifted by a CH-47D Chinook helicopter to the US Army Aviation Museum at Fort Rucker, Alabama on December 8, 1987. The XCH-62 prototype, the largest helicopter ever built in the western countries, was displayed at the US Army Aviation Museum until it was later scrapped in 2005. In 2008, several parts were sent to the Helicopter Museum at Weston-super-Mare (United Kingdom), to be exhibited there.

Design

The XCH-62 is a tandem rotor helicopter, with four blades on each rotor. Its rotor diameter was to be , fuselage length , and footprint length . The fuselage was mounted high to provide  of ground clearance, which let the helicopter taxi over a container for lifting. However, the taxiing requirement was later eliminated because of the helicopter's ability to hover and lift a load, so a second prototype would probably have had only  of ground clearance, which would lower the overall height and reduce the amount of modifications required for the helicopter to fit into hangars.

Its widely spaced landing gear would allow it to straddle heavy cargoes such as armored vehicles, and still carry twelve troops in its slender fuselage. Boeing also considered selling a commercial version, the "Model 301". The helicopter was powered by three Allison XT701-AD-700 turboshafts, developed from Allison's 501-M62B engines, which each produced  static sea-level power to rotate a shaft at 11,485 rpm. A combiner gearbox converted the power of the three shafts into two transmission shafts turning at 7,976 rpm, leading into forward and aft rotor transmissions that produced  at 155.7 rpm. The XCH-62 was designed to be the first helicopter with a fly-by-wire flight control system without a mechanical backup.

Specifications (XCH-62A)

See also

References

Citations

Bibliography

External links

 XCH-62 Boeing Vertol HLH

H-062
Boeing XCH-62
1970s United States helicopters
Tandem rotor helicopters
Cancelled military aircraft projects of the United States
Three-turbine helicopters